Trois Pitons is a second-order administrative division and populated place in the Castries District of the island nation of Saint Lucia. it is located at the northern end of the island towards its heart, near Four Roads Junction, Dubrassay, and Ti Rocher.

See also
List of cities in Saint Lucia
Castries District

References

Towns in Saint Lucia